The Leipziger Baumwollspinnerei (Leipzig Cotton Mill) is an industrial site in Leipzig, Germany.  Parts of this 10-hectare site in the district of Lindenau are used today by art galleries, studios and restaurants.

Founded in 1884, the business developed into the largest cotton mill in continental Europe over the next quarter century. During this time, an entire industrial town with over 20 factories, workers' housing, kindergartens and a recreational area, grew in western Leipzig. Up to 4,000 people worked there, until production of thread was halted in 1993 following the reunification of Germany several years earlier.

Subsequently, the area was repopulated by a mixture of people including craftsmen, self-employed, and above all artists, many belonging to the so-called "New Leipzig School".  More than half of the available space has since been rented out again for new purposes.

Ten galleries, a communal arts center (Halle 14), and around 100 artists (including Neo Rauch, Jim Whiting, Hans Aichinger, and Matthias Weischer) have all settled at the site, as well as restaurants, fashion designers, architects, printers, a goldsmith, a pottery, a film club, a porcelain manufacturer, and an arts supply store.

The site contained several platform interchanges from a now-disused railway between Lindenau and Plagwitz.  Parts of the platforms are still intact.

External links
 Home page in English, including history.
 Pinsel statt Spule Nina Apin, Die Tageszeitung, 6 April 2005. 
 'The hottest place on earth' Gordon Burn, The Guardian, 1 February 2007 
 'Wunderbar! The best of Germany' Andrew Eames and Barbara Geier, The Guardian, 19 March 2011. 
 Mit vielen Wassern gewaschen: Leipzigs neue Ufer Beatrice Härig, Monumente Online, February 2008. 
 International Hotspot, Hip Community or Art Ghetto? – the Leipziger Baumwollspinnerei Sigrun Hellmich, Goethe Institut, July 2009. 
 

Art museums and galleries in Germany
Buildings and structures in Leipzig
Tourist attractions in Saxony
Textile mills in Germany
Cotton mills